Kochert is a surname.

 Bibiana Maria Köchert (1942–1996), Austrian-American film, television, and stage actress
 Gotfrid Köchert (1918–1986), Austrian sailor
 Stéphanie Kochert (born 1975), French politician

See also 

 A. E. Köchert, jewellers

Surnames
Surnames of Austrian origin